A Heart Whose Love Is Innocent is Tristesse de la Lune's first full-length album.

Track listing
 "Coriolis" – 4:47
 "Die Andere In Dir" – 5:51
 "Queen of the Damned (Album Version)" – 4:22
 "Poisoned Souls" – 5:14
 "Stone" – 3:58
 "All the Pain" – 4:22
 "Unsichtbare Erinnerung" – 4:16
 "Eiskalte Liebe (feat. Erk Aicrag)" – 4:59
 "Strangeland" – 4:46
 "Ein Mensch Wie Du" – 5:41
 "Desire" – 5:41
 "Leave It All Behind" – 3:35

Singles
 Eiskalte Liebe (feat. Hocico-singer Erk Aicrag), 2002
 Queen of the Damned, 2003

References

External links 
  Tristesse De La Lune – A Heart Whose Love Is Innocent  on Discogs

2003 albums